Nogales (English:  or ,) is a city in Santa Cruz County, Arizona. The population was 20,837 at the 2010 census and estimated 20,103 in 2019. Nogales forms part of the larger Tucson–Nogales combined statistical area, with a total population of 1,027,683 as of the 2010 Census. The city is the county seat of Santa Cruz County.

Nogales forms Arizona's largest transborder agglomeration with its adjacent, much larger twin Nogales, Sonora, across the Mexican border. The southern terminus of Interstate 19 is located in Nogales at the U.S.–Mexico border; the highway continues south into Mexico as Mexico Federal Highway 15. The highways meeting in Nogales are a major road intersection in the CANAMEX Corridor, connecting Canada, the United States, and Mexico. Nogales also is the beginning of the Arizona Sun Corridor, an economically important trade region stretching from Nogales to Prescott, including the Tucson and Phoenix metropolitan areas.

Nogales is home to four international ports of entry, including the Morley Pedestrian Port of Entry, Dennis Deconcini Pedestrian and Passenger Vehicle Port of Entry, Nogales International Airport, and the Mariposa Port of Entry. The Nogales-Mariposa Port of Entry has twelve passenger vehicle inspection lanes and eight commercial inspection lanes.

Due to its location on the border and its major ports of entry, Nogales funnels an estimated $30 billion worth of international trade into Arizona and the United States, per year, in fresh produce and manufactured goods from Mexico and the world through the deep sea port in Guaymas, Sonora, Mexico. This trade helps to support tens of thousands of jobs and the overall economies in Ambos Nogales and throughout the American state of Arizona and the Mexican state of Sonora.

The town is named for the black walnut trees which once grew abundantly in the mountain pass between the cities of Nogales, Arizona, and Nogales, Sonora, and can still be found around the town.

History

The name Nogales is derived from the Spanish word for 'walnut' or 'walnut tree'. It refers to the large stands of walnut trees that once stood in the mountain pass where Nogales is located.

Nogales was at the beginning of the 1775–1776 Juan Bautista de Anza Expedition as it entered the present-day U.S. from New Spain, and the town is now on the Juan Bautista de Anza National Historic Trail. On the second floor of the 1904 Nogales Courthouse is a small room dedicated to the 1775–1776 Anza Expedition.

In 1841, a land grant from the Mexican government to the Elías family established Los Nogales de Elías. Following the Gadsden purchase in 1853, Nogales became a part of the United States of America. In 1880, Russian-Jewish immigrants Isaac and Jacob Isaacson homesteaded the trading post of Isaacson, Arizona, at present-day Nogales. The U.S. Postal Service opened the Isaacson post office but renamed it as Nogales in 1883.

In 1915, according to historian David Leighton, Sonora Gov. Jose M. Maytorena ordered the construction of an 11-wire fence, separating Nogales, Sonora from Nogales, Arizona, but it was taken down four months later.

On August 27, 1918, a battle between United States Army forces and Mexican militia – mostly civilian in composition – took place. Culminating as the result of a decade's worth of tensions originating from the Mexican Revolution and earlier battles in Nogales along the border in 1913 and 1915, the main consequence of the 1918 violence saw the building of the first permanent border wall between Nogales, Arizona, and Nogales, Sonora, along the previously unobstructed boundary line on International Street.

Demographics

As of the 2010 census, there were 20,878 people, 5,985 households, and 4,937 families residing in the city. The racial makeup of the city was 71.7% White, 0.4% Black or African American, 0.6% Native American, 0.6% Asian, 0.0% Pacific Islander, 24.3% from other races, and 2.4% from two or more races. 95.0% of the population were Hispanic or Latino of any race.

There were 6,362 households, out of which 38.8% had children under the age of 18 living with them, 47.9% were married couples living together, 24.2% had a female householder with no husband present, and 22.5% were non-families. 15.1% of all households were made up of individuals, and 9.9% had someone living alone who was 65 years of age or older. The average household size was 3.12 and the average family size was 3.62.

In the city, the population was spread out, with 34.6% under the age of 18, 9.5% from 18 to 24, 25.5% from 25 to 44, 19.5% from 45 to 64, and 10.8% who were 65 years of age or older. The median age was 30 years. For every 100 females, there were 88.1 males. For every 100 females age 18 and over, there were 81.3 males.

The median income for a household in the city was $28,044, and the median income for a family was $24,637. Males had a median income of $24,636 versus $18,403 for females. The per capita income for the city was $14,440. About 30.8% of families and 32.7% of the population were below the poverty line, including 41.2% of those under age 18 and 32.9% of those age 65 or over.

Geography

Climate
Nogales has a semi-arid steppe climate (Köppen BSh/BSk), which is less hot and more rainy than a typical arid climate  such as Phoenix. Lows typically settle just above the freezing mark on a majority of nights, but it is not uncommon to see temperatures tumble below  on some winter nights.

Nighttime lows for the summer months remain in the lower to mid 60s for the duration of the season. Some monsoon season storms are capable of producing several inches of rain in a short amount of time, creating flash flood hazards.

Economy
The economy of Nogales is heavily dependent on the cross-border trade through its Ports of Entry by produce distributors and American-based manufacturing plants in Nogales, Sonora and throughout the rest of the Mexican states of Sonora and Sinaloa. Most of Nogales' economy is based on agribusiness and produce distributors, which comes from large farms in the Mexican agri-belt. Despite its small population, Nogales actually receives much patronage from its bordering sister-city, Nogales, Sonora, Mexico. Most observers guess the population of Nogales, Sonora, at roughly 300,000. International commerce is a big part of Nogales’ economy. More than 60 percent of Nogales’ sales tax comes from the estimated 30,000 Mexican shoppers crossing the border daily. Nogales, Arizona, and Nogales, Sonora, are home to one of the largest maquiladora clusters. This enables American manufacturing plants on both sides of the border to take advantage of favorable wage and operating costs and excellent transportation and distribution networks.

The Consulate-General of Mexico in Nogales is located on 135 W. Cardwell St.

The United States Department of Homeland Security is a major economic driver in the Ambos Nogales region, with thousands of employees working for both the Border Patrol and Customs and Border Protection. Due to the large federal, state, and local police presence, Nogales has one of the highest police per-capita levels in the United States.

The largest employers in Nogales are:
 Seattle Sports
 City of Nogales
 County of Santa Cruz
 Dependable Home Health
 E.D.S. Manufacturing
 Holy Cross Hospital
 The Home Depot
 Mariposa Community Health Center
 Nogales Unified School District
 Safeway
 Prestolite Wire
 UPS Supply Chain Solutions
 Walmart

Scenic attractions
The county of Santa Cruz and the city of Nogales have 200 properties listed in the National Register of Historic Sites, including Tumacacori National Monument first visited by Father Eusebio Kino in 1691 and Tubac Presidio, established by the Spanish in 1752 on an Indian village site. Others include the Old Tubac Schoolhouse, Old Nogales City Hall, Santa Cruz County Courthouse, and Patagonia Railroad Depot. The Patagonia-Sonoita Creek Sanctuary, 19 miles east, attracts worldwide visitors to see its diverse bird life. It is also host to ghost towns and mining camps, curio shops, first-class restaurants and night clubs.

The Santa Cruz County Historical Courthouse on Morley Street/Court Street has the statue of Lady Justice on top of the building. The Nogales version of Lady Justice is not wearing a blindfold.

Interesting architecture and historical homes along Crawford and Court Streets provide a glimpse of border life at its peak during that time period. A day trip to old Nogales, Sonora reveals many of the same architectural uniqueness.

Several state parks and recreation areas are located close to Nogales, including Patagonia State Park, Peña Blanca Lake, Parker Canyon Lake, and Coronado National Forest. The Wine Country of Sonoita-Elgin is also located 20 miles east of Nogales.

Government
The City of Nogales operates under a council-manager form of government in which the mayor is elected to a 4-year term and has a single vote on the city council. The council then hires a city manager to run the day-to-day operations of the city. The 6 city council members are elected at-large to 4-year terms.

Transportation
Nogales is located at the south end of Interstate 19. Arizona State Route 189 connects Interstate 19 with the Nogales-Mariposa Port of Entry and Mexican Federal Highway 15. Arizona State Route 82 connects Nogales with Patagonia and Sonoita. Interstate 11 is proposed to replace I-19, terminating in Nogales.

Santa Cruz County operates the Nogales International Airport, a general use airport.

Local bus transportation in Nogales is currently provided by local companies. Private bus companies Greyhound and TUFESA, as well as several shuttle companies, connect Nogales with Tucson and points north.

In popular culture
Many dozens of motion pictures have been filmed around the Nogales area. The Hangover Part III (2013) was partially filmed in Nogales during late 2012. Parts of town were decorated to appear to be Tijuana, Mexico. Dog (2022) was partially set in Nogales, as the location for the funeral scene at the end, although these scenes were filmed in Los Angeles, California.

Georges Simenon's novel The Bottom of the Bottle is set in Nogales. A small part of William Gibson's short story, "The Gernsback Continuum" refers to the city of Nogales. It is also mentioned as a border crossing point in Carlos Castaneda's Don Juan series, and a gateway into the Mexican Yaqui communities of Sonora.

Nogales is discussed at length in the popular political economics book Why Nations Fail, comparing the relative success of Nogales, Arizona, to the poverty of Nogales, Sonora.

Oscar winner Benicio del Toro dedicated his award to Ambos Nogales during his acceptance speech at the 73rd Annual Academy Awards in 2001.

Notable people

 Bob Baffert – 2015 & 2018 Triple Crown winner, champion horse breeder and trainer
 Andrew Leo Bettwy – Arizona State Land Commissioner 1970–78
 Movita Castaneda – Actress best known for being the second wife of actor Marlon Brando
 Travis Edmonson – Member of 1960's influential folk duo "Bud & Travis"
 Adrian Fontes – 22nd and current Secretary of State of Arizona since 2023
 John Frederick "Jack" Hannah – Academy Award-winning Disney Studios artist and director
 Gil Heredia – 10-year Major League Baseball pitcher and University of Arizona Sports Hall of Fame member, born 1965.
 Christine McIntyre – Actress, starred in 22 feature films, most notably as supporting character in Three Stooges films
 Charles Mingus – Jazz bass player, composer, and bandleader
 Jack O'Connor – Longtime firearms editor for Outdoor Life magazine, hunted and collected trophies throughout the world, introduced readers to hunting and firearms
 Alberto Alvaro Ríos – Author, poet, won the 1981 Walt Whitman award for "Whispering to Fool the Wind", current State of Arizona Poet Laureate.
 John Scearce – Professional soccer player
 Roger Smith – Actor, star of 77 Sunset Strip, husband to movie star Ann-Margret.
 Verita Bouvaire-Thompson – Actress turned hairdresser best known for her 14-year reputed affair with actor Humphrey Bogart

See also

 Battle of Nogales (1913)
 Battle of Nogales (1915)
 Battle of Ambos Nogales

References

External links

 Official government website
 Nogales-Santa Cruz County Chamber of Commerce
 Nogales Unified School District

 
Cities in Arizona
County seats in Arizona
Mexico–United States border crossings
Micropolitan areas of Arizona
Cities in Santa Cruz County, Arizona
Populated places in the Sonoran Desert
Twin cities
1841 establishments in Mexico
Divided cities